Matthew Freud (born 2 November 1963) is head of Freud Communications, an international public relations firm in the United Kingdom.

Early life
Freud is the son of the actress June Flewett and the writer and German-born British politician Sir Clement Freud. Matthew Freud's sister is television interviewer Emma Freud. His great-grandfather was Sigmund Freud. He is the nephew of the artist Lucian Freud and (by former marriage) of the writer Lady Caroline Blackwood, and his cousins include fashion designer Bella Freud, and novelists Susie Boyt, and Esther Freud.

Career
Matthew Freud founded Freud Communications in 1985. Adam Curtis in his documentary Century of the Self describes Matthew Freud as a star in the "new culture of public relations and marketing in politics, business and journalism" that rose in the Clinton-Blair years. In 2009 PRWeek called Freud "the most influential PR professional in the UK".

Freud, his sister Emma and brother-in-law Richard Curtis, sit on the board of Trustees for Comic Relief.

In May 2005, in partnership with Piers Morgan, he acquired ownership of the Press Gazette and the British Press Awards in a deal worth £1million. Several major newspapers boycotted the event citing an apparent conflict of interest as one of the reasons.

According to the Sunday Times Rich List in 2020, Freud is worth an estimated £170 million, a decrease of £10m from the previous year.

Personal life
Freud's first wife was Caroline Hutton with whom he had two sons: George Rupert Freud and Jonah Henry Freud. Caroline then married the 9th Earl Spencer, brother of Diana, Princess of Wales.

His second wife was Elisabeth Murdoch, second daughter of media magnate Rupert Murdoch, head of News Corporation. When the couple began dating (while working as colleagues), she was pregnant with a second child by her first husband and business partner, Elkin Pianim (the son of Ghanaian financial and political mogul Kwame Pianim). The couple married 18 August 2001 at Blenheim Palace; they have two children, a daughter born in 2000 and a son born in 2007. They divorced in 2014. During the divorce, it emerged that Freud had fathered a child with a mutual friend two years previously, born in 2012.

His son was asleep in the front of the car at the time of the offence. Exeter Magistrates' Court was told that he had already incurred nine penalty points on his driving licence in the previous three years–two fixed penalties for speeding and one for using a mobile phone while driving.

He is a friend of several members of the Conservative party, including George Osborne and David Cameron. Freud has also invited Cameron to many events and is part of the so-called 'Notting Hill Set' of influential Conservative-linked figures. During their marriage, Murdoch and Freud owned Burford Priory in Oxfordshire, and hence were also considered members of the Chipping Norton set.

See also
 Freud family

References

External links
Freud Communications official website.
.
Matthew Freud collected news and commentary at The Independent.
Matthew Freud collected news and commentary at The London Evening Standard.
Matthew Freud collected news and commentary at The Times of India.
Follow-Up: Roger Ailes on Matthew Freud, The New York Times, 13 January 2010.
Matthew Freud Is The Most Powerful PR Operator In The UK, Danny Rogers, PRWeek, 18 May 2011.

1963 births
English businesspeople
Matthew
English people of German-Jewish descent
English people of Austrian-Jewish descent
Place of birth missing (living people)
Living people
Murdoch family
People educated at Westminster School, London
English public relations people